Bonneville Offroad Racing (BOR) is a desert racing organization based in Salt Lake City, UT.

Bonneville Off-road Racing Enthusiasts (BORE), the predecessor to BOR, was established by Jim Baker in 1989 as a local, more affordable, friendlier, alternative to the Southern California and Mexico races put on by  SCORE.  Even with its lean organizational team, it offered full-seasons of challenging, well-planned and well-marked courses; with all the ear-marks and perks of a much larger, professionally run, organization (e.g., big-name event sponsors, informative newsletters, comprehensive points-scoring, computerized event-timing).  It is believed to be the first of its kind to have state-of-the-art, computerized, event-timing with real-time scoring (developed by Potter Engineering & Consulting); which allowed racers and spectators to monitor the up-to-the-minute race-status of all event entries.  Before his own passing (in 2014), Jim passed the leadership-torch to a team of enthusiastic successors; who continue to put on races in Northern Utah, Northeastern Nevada, and Southern Idaho.

Events 
The BOR racing series consists of four events a year, taking place from April to October. 

 Vernal Dinosaur Dash -  Vernal, UT
 Jackpot 200 -  Jackpot, NV
 Knolls 200 -  Knolls, UT
 Wendover 250 -  Wendover, UT

Historical Events 

 Ely 200 -  Ely, NV
 Aragonite GP -  Aragonite, UT
 Delle GP -  Delle, UT

References 

Off-road racing series
Auto racing organizations in the United States